The Cloverdale Fairgrounds (also known as the Cloverdale Exhibition Grounds) are located in the town of Cloverdale in Surrey, British Columbia. Since 1938, it has been the host site of Canada's second largest rodeo, the Cloverdale Rodeo and Country Fair.

The Fairgrounds

It is bordered by 60th Avenue, 64th Avenue, 176th Street (which, in turn, is part of Highway 15, which leads to the United States), residential properties and Lord Tweedsmuir Secondary School. The Fraser Downs casino and racetrack leases  of the Fairgrounds.

Notable facilities

Agriplex

It can seat up to 1530 spectators. It commonly hosts horse shows, concerts, trade shows, fundraisers and dances.

Alice McKay Building

This building seats 350 people for banquets and 750 in the stands. It is commonly used for boxing, wrestling, dog training, swap meets and children's dances. The Fairgrounds' administration offices are located here.

Cloverdale Millennium Amphitheatre
The amphitheatre is located at the corner of 64th Avenue and 176th Street. It is commonly used for company picnics, festivals, dog shows and theatre groups. The city of Surrey has held Canada Day festivities there.

Stetson Bowl Stadium

The Stetson Bowl Stadium is home to most of the Cloverdale Rodeo performances each year. The bleachers can hold 4000 spectators and portable seating can accommodate 800 additional spectators. Besides the rodeo, the stadium is commonly used for filming, festivals, concerts, sporting events and dog training classes.

Shannon Hall
This  building houses 480 people for banquet-style seating and 700 for theatre-style seating. It is commonly used for weddings, dances, swap meets and memorials.

Show Barn

The Show Barn is an  building that seats 750 people for banquets and 900 for its theatre-style seating. Commonly, it hosts kennel shows, trade shows and auctions. It also houses 89 horse stalls.

Cloverdale Arena
The Cloverdale Arena is a skating arena that is home to mostly ice hockey (including sledge hockey) and figure skating events, as well as the occasional concert and lacrosse game. It provides  of exhibition space and seats 250 spectators.

Elements Casino
Elements is a racetrack and casino located on the Fairgrounds but leased to the separately owned Great Canadian Gaming, the second largest casino operator in British Columbia. There are harness racing events there nine months per year, from September to May.

See also
Cloverdale Rodeo and Country Fair
Cloverdale, British Columbia

References

External links
A map of the Fairgrounds (PDF file)
Fraser Downs official site

Parks in Surrey, British Columbia
Fairgrounds in Canada
Casinos in British Columbia